Commercials GAA is a Gaelic Athletic Association club located in Rathcoole, County Dublin, Ireland. The club is concerned with the games of hurling and camogie.

History

Commercials Hurling Club was established in 1886. The club was home to the many bar and shop workers who had moved from to Dublin from rural Ireland seeking employment. The club first played their matches in Dublin city centre and, like a lot of clubs at the time, they trained in the Phoenix Park.

The club was less than a decade in existence when Commercials claimed its first Dublin SHC in 1895. It was the first of a record five successive titles. In all, Commercials won nine titles in the first 30 years of their existence. Successes in the lower grades was also achieved, with Dublin IHC and Dublin JHC titles being secured on a number of occasions.

Honours

Dublin Senior Hurling Championship (9): 1895, 1896, 1897, 1898, 1899, 1905, 1907, 1909, 1916
Dublin Intermediate Hurling Championship (3): 1964, 1977, 1991
Dublin Junior Hurling Championship (3): 1925, 1940, 2022

Notable players

 Pat Mulcahy
 Razzler Delaney- As the great Brian Coady once said A one Calved Razzle is better than 6 Culchies

References

Gaelic games clubs in County Dublin
Hurling clubs in County Dublin